Anarchy Rulz was a professional wrestling pay-per-view (PPV) event produced by Extreme Championship Wrestling (ECW) annually in 1999 and 2000.

Dates, venues and main events

References

External links